Southwestern Tasmanian, or Toogee, is a possible aboriginal language of Tasmania. It is the most poorly attested known variety of Tasmanian, and it is not clear how distinct it was. It was apparently spoken along the west coast of the island, south of Macquarie Harbour.

Southwestern Tasmanian is attested from a single word list, collected in Port Davey by George Augustus Robinson from the Ninenee Tribe of the Bathurst Harbour area. There are 131 words, but some of these may be from Southeastern Tasmanian languages. The data are consistent with a Western Tasmanian language, but were not clean enough to allow classification by Bowern (2012); Dixon & Crowley (1981) had likewise left it alone.

History
The Toogee were Tasmanian aborigines that lived in Western Tasmania, Australia, before European settlement.  Their area of inhabitation included Macquarie Harbour.  This tribe consisted of two different bands, the Lowreenne and Ninegin.  They made stone tools, including those from Darwin Glass - a natural glass formed from a meteorite impact. The archeological record for this region goes back to 20,000 years, with relics found in the Kuti Kina Cave. The Toogee also left behind middens of shells along the coast.

References

Western Tasmanian languages
South West Tasmania
Languages extinct in the 19th century